Brant may refer to:

Places 
 Brant County, Ontario, Canada
 Brant (electoral district), Ontario, Canada
 Brant North, Ontario, Canada
 Brant South, Ontario, Canada
 Brant South (provincial electoral district), Ontario, Canada
 Brant—Wentworth, Ontario, Canada
 Brantford, Ontario, Canada
 Brantville, New Brunswick, Canada
 Brant, Alberta, Canada
 Brant Broughton, a village in Lincolnshire, England
 Brant Fell, a hill in the Lake District, North West England
 Brant Island, Massachusetts, United States
 Brant Township, Michigan, United States
 Brant, New York, United States
 Brant Lake, New York, United States
 Brant, Wisconsin, United States

People 
 Brant (surname), people with the surname Brant
 Brant Alyea, American former professional baseball outfielder
 Brant Bjork, American musician
 Brant Boyer, American former football linebacker
 Brant Brown, American hitting coach
 Brant Chambers, Australian rules footballer
 Brant Colledge, Australian rules footballer
 Brant Daugherty, American actor
 Brant Gardner, American researcher
 Brant Garvey, Australian paratriathlete
 Brant Hansen, American radio show host and author
 Brant Kuithe, American football tight end
 Brant Little, Canadian middle-distance runner
 Brant Miller, American meteorologist
 Brant Parker, American cartoonist
 Brant Pinvidic, Canadian film director
 Brant J. Pitre, American theologian
 Brant Rosen, American rabbi and blogger
 Brant Ust, Belgian former professional baseball player
 Brant Weidner, American former professional basketball player
 Brant Woodward, New Zealand sport shooter

Ships 
 CCGS Brant, a Canadian Coast Guard navigation aids vessel
 USFS Brant, a United States Bureau of Fisheries fishery patrol vessel in commission from 1926 to 1940 which then served in the Fish and Wildlife Service fleet as US FWS Brant from 1940 to 1953
 , more than one United States Navy ship

Other uses 
 Brant (goose) (Branta bernicla), a species of goose (also known as the Brent goose)
 Brant's Volunteers, an irregular corps raised in 1777 during the American Revolutionary War by Joseph Brant
 Black Brant (rocket), a Canadian-designed sounding rocket

See also 
 
 
 Brandt (disambiguation)

ja:ブラント